G. nepalensis may refer to:

 Gerbera nepalensis, an ornamental plant
 Gonepteryx nepalensis, an Old World butterfly
 Gonydactylus nepalensis, a bent-toed gecko
 Gunvorita nepalensis, a ground beetle
 Gynura nepalensis, an Asian plant